Rojas is a Spanish-language surname.

Rojas may also refer to:

Rojas, Buenos Aires, town located in the north-east of the Buenos Aires Province, Argentina
Rojas, Province of Burgos, municipality and town located in Castile and León, Spain.
Rojas Cove, 1 km wide cove indenting the coast of Greenwich Island in the South Shetland Islands, Antarctica
Rojas de Cuauhtémoc, town and municipality in Oaxaca in south-western Mexico
Rojas Magallanes metro station, elevated metro station in Santiago, Chile
Rojas Municipality, one of the 12 municipios in the Venezuelan state of Barinas
Rojas novads, municipality in Courland, Latvia
Rojas Partido, partido located in the north of Buenos Aires Province in Argentina
Rojas Peak, in the center of Lemaire Island, Danco Coast, Graham Land, Antarctica
Cristóbal Rojas Municipality, Miranda, municipios in the Venezuelan state of Miranda
Ernesto Rojas Commandos, small guerrilla group in Colombia
Estadio General Pablo Rojas, football stadium in Barrio Obrero in Asunción, Paraguay
Teniente Cesar Lopez Rojas District, one of six districts of the province Alto Amazonas in Peru

See also
 Roxas (disambiguation), archaic spelling